Andreas Cahling (born 1952) is a professional bodybuilder. He won the IFBB Mr. International title in 1980. He also appeared as Thor in the movie Kung Fury.

In the 1980s, Cahling was an lacto-ovo vegetarian.

References

Living people
Swedish bodybuilders
Swedish male judoka
1953 births